Muslima Odilova is an Uzbekistani Paralympic swimmer. She represented Uzbekistan at the 2016 Summer Paralympics held in Rio de Janeiro, Brazil and she won two silver medals: in the women's 50 metre freestyle S13 event and in the women's 100 metre butterfly S13 event.

She also represented Uzbekistan at the 2020 Summer Paralympics held in Tokyo, Japan. She competed in one event: the women's 100 metre butterfly S13 event.

References

External links 
 

Living people
Year of birth missing (living people)
Place of birth missing (living people)
Swimmers at the 2016 Summer Paralympics
Swimmers at the 2020 Summer Paralympics
Medalists at the 2016 Summer Paralympics
Paralympic silver medalists for Uzbekistan
Uzbekistani female butterfly swimmers
Uzbekistani female freestyle swimmers
S13-classified Paralympic swimmers
Paralympic swimmers of Uzbekistan
Paralympic medalists in swimming
21st-century Uzbekistani women